Italy at the Military World Games has participated in all editions held, since the first edition of 1995 Military World Games.

Medal count
Italy won 359 medals at the Military World Games (297 at the Summer Games and 62 at the Winter Games).

Summer Games

Athletics

Medals

Details

See also 
Italy at the Olympics
Italy at the Paralympics
Italy at the Mediterranean Games
Italy at the Summer Universiade
Italy national athletics team

References

External links
 CISM website

Military
Military sport in Italy
ITaly